James McLaren Henderson (1 May 1907 – 5 March 2009), better known as Mac Henderson was a Scotland international rugby union player and then businessman, founding one of Edinburgh's most famous restaurants, Henderson's.

Rugby Union career

Amateur career

Henderson was born in 1907 in Elphinstone, near Tranent and attended Edinburgh Academy. On leaving school her played for Dunbar but he then moved to Edinburgh where he played for Edinburgh Academicals.

A farmer by trade, Henderson also worked on New Zealand sheep stations. While in New Zealand he played rugby union for the Hawkes Bay side Waipukarau.

Before he could be selected to play for the provincial Hawkes Bay side, he unfortunately was moved to another sheep station. Henderson recalled: "An official said he would eat his hat if I wasn't selected for Hawke's Bay".

On his return to Scotland he again played for Edinburgh Academicals.

He also played rugby union for Haddington.

Provincial career

He played for Edinburgh District in their inter-city match against Glasgow District on 3 December 1932. Edinburgh won the match 15 - 3.

International career

He was capped three times by Scotland, all in 1933. Scotland won all 3 matches and secured the Triple Crown.

His career in rugby came to an abrupt end after he received a serious ligament  injury while on a tour with the Barbarians later that year.

Business career

Farming

Henderson had a farm in East Lothian.

In 1962, Henderson and his wife opened a farm shop in Edinburgh as an outlet for their produce.

Restaurateur

In 1963, they opened a vegetarian restaurant, Henderson's in Hanover Street in the centre of Edinburgh, "which has long since established itself as an institution in the city."

Family

Henderson met Janet Millar, while playing tennis at a friend's home at Gullane. Millar was an architect's daughter and in 1932 the couple married in a society wedding in Troon. His wife had been told she could not have children, but she believed that a healthy, vegetarian diet would make her fertile. The couple went on to have seven children; five sons named Andrew, John, Peter, Nicholas and Oliver; two daughters, Sara and Catherine. At his death Henderson had 14 grandchildren and six great-grandchildren.

His brother Ian was also an international rugby player.

Legacy

On the occasion of his 100th birthday in 2007, Scottish Rugby held a lunch in honour of Henderson at Murrayfield Stadium. He was the first of Scotland's international players to become a centenarian.

He died on 5 March 2009 at the age of 101 as the longest-lived Test player in rugby union history.

References

External links
Hendersons Of Edinburgh
 Profile at Scrum.com

1907 births
2009 deaths
20th-century Scottish businesspeople
Businesspeople from Edinburgh
Dunbar RFC players
Edinburgh Academicals rugby union players
Edinburgh District (rugby union) players
Haddington RFC players
Men centenarians
People educated at Edinburgh Academy
Rugby union players from East Lothian
Scotland international rugby union players
Scottish centenarians
Scottish restaurateurs
Scottish rugby union players
Rugby union number eights